Jamie Murphy (born 29 December 1989) is a Welsh rugby league player currently for the West Wales Raiders in the RFL League 1. He previously played rugby union for Bridgend Ravens & Newport RFC Aberavon Wizards, and Ospreys (3 apps, all in the Anglo-Welsh Cup).

Rugby League
In October and November 2015, Jamie represented Wales rugby league team in the 2015 European Cup.

Rugby Union
In February 2009, he played in 1 match for Wales national under-20 rugby union team at U20 Six Nations.

In February 2017, Jamie made his début for Germany rugby union team in the Six Nations B tournament defeating Romania, he qualifies through his grandmother.

References

External links
 Profiles: ESPN Scrum, It's Rugby, Bridgend Ravens, Crusaders RL, South Wales Scorpions

news.bbc.co.uk/sport2/hi/rugby_league/…crusaders/8718357.stm -

1989 births
Living people
Aberavon RFC players
Bridgend Blue Bulls players
Bridgend RFC players
Crusaders Rugby League players
German rugby league players
German rugby union players
Dual-code rugby internationals
Gloucestershire All Golds players
Newport RFC players
North Wales Crusaders players
Ospreys (rugby union) players
Rugby league players from Bridgend
Rugby union players from Bridgend
South Wales Scorpions players
Welsh people of German descent
Wales national rugby league team players
Welsh rugby league players
Welsh rugby union players